Epinephelus is a genus of marine ray-finned fish, groupers from the subfamily Epinephelinae, part of the family Serranidae, which also includes the anthias and sea basses. They are predatory fish, largely associated with reefs and are found in tropical and subtropical seas throughout the world. They are important target species for fisheries.

Characteristics
The fishes in the genus Epinephelus have elongate, subcylindrical bodies which may be oblong or deep and compressed in shape. The depth of the body varies between 2.3 and 3.7 times the standard length and head is usually around the same length as the body is deep. The preopercle can be rounded or angular and has a serrated rear edge with the serrations at the angle being enlarged to a lesser or greater extent. In a small number of species serrations are small and on the lower edge they are covered by skin. Caniform teeth are found at the front of jaws, although these can be rather small in a few species. They do not have any obviously enlarged caniform teeth in the middle of the lower jaw. There are teeth on the roof of the mouth. In adults, the maxilla does not have a noticeable bony protrusion on the lower rear angle, although they can have an deep step or hook-like process which is hidden by the upper lips, on the rear part of its lower edge. The dorsal fin normally contains 9 spines, although some species have 10, as well as 12 to 19 rays. The origin of the dorsal fin sits above the opercle and the soft rayed part is shorter than the spiny part. The anal fin contains 3 distinct spines and 7 to 10 soft rays. The pectoral fin is rounded with its middle rays being longer than the others longest. The caudal fin may be rounded, truncate or concave, contains 8 branched rays and 8 to 10  fin rays which are slender, unbranched and unsegmented (referred to as "procurrent") fin rays at the leading edges of he caudal fin on the upper lobe and 7 branched rays and 7 to 10 procurrent rays in the lower lobe. The body is covered in ctenoid or smooth scales.

Habitat and biology
Epinephelus groupers are occur mainly on coral or rocky reefs, although a small number of species have been recorded over substrates consisting of sand, silt or mud. Most of the species in the genus Epinephelus are predatory fish which feed on larger invertebrates, mostly crustaceans, and other fishes taken on or close to the substrate. E. undulosus is an unusual grouper species distinguished by having many, long gill rakers and this species has been reported to feed on pelagic tunicates, at least on occasion. Only a few species have had their reproductive biology studied and many species appear to be protogynous hermaphrodites. However, in some species there are males in the populations which are smaller than some of the females, suggesting a more complex biology and this suggests that some females do not change sex, and that some males may not have a undergone a functional female stage.

Distribution
Epinephelus species are found around the world in tropical and subtropical seas and oceans. The greatest diversity occurs in the  Indo-West Pacific, while 8 species are found in the eastern Pacific, 11 in the western Atlantic Ocean 9 species in the eastern Atlantic Ocean and the Mediterranean. Four species have entered the Mediterranean Sea from the Red Sea via the Suez Canal as Lessepsian migrants.

Utilisation
Epinephelus groupers are among the most valuable species exploited by commercial fishes in the world's tropical seas and they fetch some of the highest prices when marketed. They have also been used in aquaculture.

Species
The 89 recognized species in this genus are:

Some of these species are placed in the genus Hyporthodus by some authorities, for example Epinephelus darwinensis is treated as Hyporthodus darwinensis by the Catalog of Fishes.

References

External links
 
 

 
Epinephelini
Extant Eocene first appearances
Taxa named by Marcus Elieser Bloch